Freddy Antonio Guzmán (born January 20, 1981) is a Dominican former professional baseball outfielder. He played in Major League Baseball (MLB) with the San Diego Padres, Texas Rangers, New York Yankees, and Tampa Bay Rays in five seasons between 2004 and 2013.

Career

San Diego Padres
Guzmán was signed as a non-drafted free agent by the San Diego Padres on April 17, . In 2004, he led all minor leaguers in stolen bases, with 90.

Guzmán made his major league debut on August 17, going 1–for-5 with a walk. He got a hit in his first six games in the majors. He missed all of the  season following Tommy John surgery.

Texas Rangers
On May 11, 2006, the Padres traded Guzmán and César Rojas to the Texas Rangers for Vince Sinisi and John Hudgins.

In 2007, Guzmán  came to spring training to compete with Kenny Lofton, Marlon Byrd, and Jerry Hairston Jr. for playing time in center field, but Guzmán did not make the Opening Day roster and played the entire season with the Triple-A Oklahoma Redhawks. Guzmán hit his first MLB home run on September 11, at Comerica Park (Detroit Tigers) off left-handed pitcher Clay Rapada.

Detroit Tigers
On December 5, 2007, Guzmán was traded to the Detroit Tigers for Chris Shelton. Just before the end of spring training, he was sent outright to the minor leagues.

Seattle, Boston, and Baltimore
Guzmán became a free agent at the end of the season, and signed a minor league contract with the Seattle Mariners. On May 11, 2009, Guzmán was released by the Mariners.

On May 16, 2009, Guzmán was signed by the Boston Red Sox and assigned to the Triple-A Pawtucket Red Sox. On July 29, 2009, he was released by the Red Sox. On August 7, Guzmán signed a minor league contract with the Baltimore Orioles.

New York Yankees
On August 31, 2009, the deadline for him to be eligible to appear in the postseason, the Orioles traded Guzmán to the New York Yankees for cash considerations. The Yankees assigned him to the Scranton/Wilkes-Barre Yankees and he stole seven bases in seven attempts in six games. On September 14, the Yankees promoted Guzmán to the major leagues. The Yankees considered adding him to their roster for the 2009 American League Division Series, but opted to add another pitcher instead. The Yankees included Guzmán on their roster for the 2009 American League Championship Series. He was removed from the roster for the 2009 World Series

Philadelphia Phillies
In February 2010, Guzmán signed a minor league contract with the Philadelphia Phillies.

Tampa Bay Rays
Guzmán played in the Mexican League during the 2011, 2012, and 2013 seasons. The Tampa Bay Rays signed Guzmán to a minor league contract on August 30, 2013. His contract was purchased by the Rays on September 17. He appeared in one game for Tampa Bay, pinch-running for Matt Joyce in the bottom of the 11th down 3-2. Guzmán stole second, then scored the tying run on David DeJesus's RBI single to tie the game, which they won the next inning 4-3. He was outrighted off the roster on October 30, 2013.

Mexican League
On April 15, 2016, Guzman was released by the Vaqueros Laguna of the Mexican League. On April 23, 2016, Guzmán signed with the Toros de Tijuana, and was released on May 2. On April 21, 2017, Guzmán signed with the Tigres de Quintana Roo. He was released on June 16, 2017.

Coaching career
After retiring, Guzmán became the hitting coach for the Dominican Summer League Nationals.

References

External links

1981 births
Living people
Acereros de Monclova players
Delfines de Ciudad del Carmen players
Dominican Republic expatriate baseball players in Mexico
Dominican Republic expatriate baseball players in the United States
Erie SeaWolves players
Eugene Emeralds players
Fort Wayne Wizards players
Idaho Falls Padres players
Lake Elsinore Storm players
Leones del Escogido players
Major League Baseball center fielders
Major League Baseball players from the Dominican Republic
Mexican League baseball outfielders
Mobile BayBears players
New York Yankees players
Norfolk Tides players
Oklahoma RedHawks players
Pawtucket Red Sox players
Petroleros de Minatitlán players
Portland Beavers players
San Diego Padres players
Scranton/Wilkes-Barre Yankees players
Tacoma Rainiers players
Tampa Bay Rays players
Texas Rangers players
Toledo Mud Hens players
Yaquis de Obregón players
Vaqueros Laguna players
Toros de Tijuana players
Tigres de Quintana Roo players
Minor league baseball coaches
Sportspeople from Santo Domingo